Jan-Olov Kindvall (born 8 May 1960) is a Swedish former footballer who played as a midfielder.
He was born in Sweden to parents Kaj and Kerstin Kindvall and he is the brother of three sisters and he was signed to MFF when he was 16 years old. Jan-Olov Kindvall currently works at MFF. During his career, his name was sometimes misspelled as "Kinnvall".

References

Association football midfielders
Swedish footballers
Allsvenskan players
Malmö FF players
Lunds BK players
1960 births
Living people